The TTT Senior Staff Association was a trade union in Trinidad and Tobago that organised senior staff at TTT, the Trinidad and Tobago Television service. TTT was merged into the National Broadcasting Network (NBN) and was later closed.

See also

 List of trade unions

Defunct trade unions of Trinidad and Tobago